World Cup USA '94 is an association football video game developed by Tiertex Design Studios and published by U.S. Gold. It was released  for Genesis, Sega CD, Super NES, Master System, DOS, Game Boy, and Game Gear in 1994. The game gives official groups, teams and the fidelity schedule of the championship. The PC and Sega CD versions have digitized stadium photos. The Genesis version carried the PolyGram Video logo across the stadium advertisement boards in the game. The Genesis version was also the first console game to support a 16:9 widescreen mode.

This was the last official FIFA World Cup franchise game before Electronic Arts acquired the rights in 1996 for the FIFA Soccer series.

Gameplay
The game is viewed from a bird's eye-view perspective. Game time may be customised from as short as a minute per half to the full regular 45 minutes. A coin toss is determined by the 'home' team and play will commence. Depending on the options set before the match, the gamer may opt to have less dribble control (resulting in the game ball sliding in the direction of the player movement); manual goalkeeper control which puts the player in control of all goalkeeper saves and kicks; ball-trapping, of which the player will not be able to shield the ball and allows opponents to snatch it away without necessitating a tackle; and no pass-back rule which was implemented during World Cup '94 where a keeper may not pick up the ball whenever an outfield player passes it back to him.

If the gamer opts for manual goalkeeper control, the player would have to make a save by guessing where the opponent will place the ball and jumping into the general direction with any of the console buttons and the directional keys if applicable. Similarly, outfield players have the option to either pass the ball, kick it (when attempting to score a goal) or attempt a lob. Freekicks may also be executed using any of the above. However, a penalty kick is done in a different game screen similar to that of World Cup 98 (video game) and where a hovering indicator swings from side to side to indicate the direction of the shot.

Basic tactics (or preset tactics) can also be customised prior to the game and may be changed in-game. Team rosters, while not based on real-life players, have variable attributes amongst its players and divided into three major skills which are speed, dribble control and shooting accuracy. Goalkeepers do not have a separate skill evaluation method and can be picked from normal players.

Playable teams
There are 24 teams qualified for the World Cup as well as 8 teams not qualified in the game.

Qualified teams

Non-qualified teams

Reception

GamePro praised the SNES version's controls, sound effects, and "amazing range of options", though they criticized the graphics. Reviewing the Genesis version for Mean Machines Sega, Steve Merrett  felt that the game is "completely outplayed by the likes of Sensi and FIFA", while Angus Swan criticized the game's presentation for "inuscule sprites, minimal animation and zeroid atmosphere."

References

External links

Video Game World Cup USA and#39;94
1994 video games
Amiga games
DOS games
Association football video games
Game Boy games
Game Gear games
Master System games
Sega Genesis games
Sega CD games
Sports video games set in the United States
Super Nintendo Entertainment System games
Tiertex Design Studios games
FIFA World Cup video games
Video games set in 1994
Video games developed in the United Kingdom